Vanda Godsell (17 November 1922 – 2 April 1990) was an English actress. Hal Erickson writes in Allmovie, "Vanda Godsell specialised in playing disheveled housewives, busybody landladies and blowsy domestics." She appeared as Mrs Weaver in This Sporting Life (1963), Mrs Pitt in Bitter Harvest (1965), and  Mrs Goodge in The Wrong Box (1967).

Early life
She was born in Bognor Regis into the Godsell family, best known for its brewery based in Stroud. Her father was an officer in the Navy and served in the Battle of Jutland, whilst her mother, Muriel, was the sister of novelist and actress Naomi Jacob. Godsell's sister Felicia was also an actress, and her other sister was an editor in the publishing world.

Career
Godsell began acting when she joined the Bristol Repertoire aged 14, making her film debut in 1953 in Flannelfoot starring Ronald Howard. She also appeared in Hell Is a City, A Shot in the Dark, The Earth Dies Screaming, The Wrong Box, Bitter Harvest, and The Pink Panther Strikes Again. She portrayed Mrs Anne Weaver in This Sporting Life. On television, she appeared in shows such as The Saint, Coronation Street, Minder, Dixon of Dock Green, The Newcomers, Gideon's Way, Bless This House, I Didn't Know You Cared, In Loving Memory, and Taxi!. She appeared as Blanche DuBois in a critically acclaimed version of A Streetcar Named Desire in the West End.

Selected filmography

 Flannelfoot (1953) as Angela Neilson
 The Large Rope (1953) as Amy Jordan
 The Brain Machine (1955) as Mae Smith
 Timeslip (1955) as Stenographer (uncredited)
 Hour of Decision (1957) as Eileen Chadwick
 Innocent Sinners (1958) - Bertha Mason as Lovejoy's Mother
 Horrors of the Black Museum (1959) as Miss Ashton
 Dial 999 (TV series), ('Ghost Squad', episode) (1959) as Margaret Saunders
 No Safety Ahead (1959) (uncredited)
 In the Wake of a Stranger (1959) as Hetty McCabe
 Hell Is a City (1960) as Lucky Lusk
 Sword of Sherwood Forest (1960) as The Prioress
 Payroll (1961) as Doll
 Konga (1961) as Bob's Mother
 Shadow of the Cat (1961) as Louise Venable
 The Frightened City (1961) as Sophie Peters
 Night Without Pity (1961) as Tart
 The Pot Carriers (1962) as Mrs Red Band
 Candidate for Murder (1962) as Betty Conlon
 Waltz of the Toreadors (1962) as Mrs. Emma Bulstrode, Dress Shop Proprietor
 Term of Trial (1962) as Mrs Thompson (uncredited)
 This Sporting Life (1963) as Mrs Anne Weaver
 The Wrong Arm of the Law (1963) as Annette
 80,000 Suspects (1963) as Mrs Agnes Davis 
 Bitter Harvest (1963) as Mrs Pitt
 The Victors (1963) as Nurse (uncredited)
 A Shot in the Dark (1964) as Madame LaFarge
 Clash by Night (1964) as Mrs Grey-Simmons
 The Earth Dies Screaming (1964) as Violet Courtland
 Dateline Diamonds (1966) as Mrs Jenkins
 The Wrong Box (1966) as Mrs Goodge
 Who Killed the Cat? (1966) as Eleanor Trellington
 A Touch of the Other (1970) as Angela
 The Pink Panther Strikes Again (1976) as Mrs Leverlilly

References

External links
 
 BBC profile

1922 births
1990 deaths
English film actresses
Actresses from Bristol
20th-century English actresses
English television actresses